Four and a half LIM domains protein 3 is a protein that in humans is encoded by the FHL3 gene.

LIM proteins are defined by the possession of a highly conserved double zinc finger motif called the LIM domain.[supplied by OMIM]

Function 

FHL3 plays a role in myogenesis and also stimulates the development of neural crest by enhancing BMP signaling.

Interactions 

FHL3 has been shown to interact with:
 CREB1,
 CTBP2, 
 FHL2, 
 ITGA7 and
 KLF3.

References

Further reading

External links 
 

Transcription factors